The minister of transport is a minister of the Crown in the Canadian Cabinet. The minister is responsible for overseeing the federal government's transportation regulatory and development department, Transport Canada, as well as Canada Post, the Saint Lawrence Seaway, Nav Canada, and the Port Authority system. Since 12 January 2021, the position has been held by Omar Alghabra of the Liberal Party.

History 
The Constitution Act, 1867 under section 92(10) established federal responsibility for land and sea transportation between provinces and internationally. Most transportation duties and powers were placed under the minister of public works, with responsibilities for ports and harbours going to the minister of marine and fisheries. In 1879, the Department of Public Works was divided in two, with powers and duties over rail and inland sea transport going to the newly formed minister of railways and canals. The minister of railways and canals was one of the most important cabinet posts because of the importance of railways to the economic development of Canada, with three prime ministers assuming the position either before or during their premiership.

In Prime Minister William Lyon Mackenzie King's third cabinet in 1935, C. D. Howe was appointed to both the minister of railways and canals and the minister of marine, which was a short-lived position split from the minister of marine and fisheries in 1930. The office of Minister of Transport was created by Mackenzie King in 1936, which was formally a successor to the minister of railways and canals, and C. D. Howe was appointed as the first Minister of Transport.

From 2006 to 2013, the position was styled Minister of Transport, Infrastructure and Communities, a name change corresponding with responsibility for Infrastructure Canada being transferred to the portfolio at that time. "Minister of Transport" remained the title for legal purposes. With the Cabinet shuffle of July 15, 2013, Infrastructure and Communities portfolio was separated from Transport and assigned to the minister of intergovernmental affairs.

Transport Canada used to manage most of Canada's major airports, but in the 1990s, most airports were off-loaded to non-profit private airport authorities. The department is now responsible for transportation safety, appointments to Boards of Governors, and regulation management.

Portfolio

In addition to Transport Canada, the minister of transport is responsible for overseeing 55 other entities, the majority of which are port authorities and airport authorities:

Transport Canada
Shared governance organizations:
 18 port authorities
 21 airport authorities
 Buffalo and Fort Erie Public Bridge Authority
 Nav Canada
 St. Lawrence Seaway Management Corporation
Crown corporations:
 Atlantic Pilotage Authority
 Canadian Air Transport Security Authority
 Federal Bridge Corporation
 Great Lakes Pilotage Authority
 Laurentian Pilotage Authority
 Marine Atlantic
 Pacific Pilotage Authority
 Ridley Terminals
 Via Rail
Other entities:
 Canadian Transportation Agency
 Ship-source Oil Pollution Fund
 The Fund for Railway Accidents Involving Designated Goods
 Transportation Appeal Tribunal of Canada

Minister of Railways and Canals (1879-1936)

Key:

Minister of Marine (1930-1936)

Key:

Minister of Transport (1936-present)

Key:

See also
Infrastructure and Communities

References

Transport
 
Canada
1936 establishments in Canada